This List of Negro league baseball champions includes champions of black baseball prior to the organization of any traditional Negro league and goes through to the collapse of segregated baseball after Jackie Robinson broke the baseball color line in 1946.  Champions include self-declared, regional and (later) league champions, but is limited to top-tier teams and major Negro leagues.  The champions listed after 1948 through the 1950s are listed for posterity, but the quality of play had deteriorated so far as to only incidentally be covered by contemporary media or historians.

1867–1891: Era of amateur and semi-pro teams 

During the formative years of black baseball, most Negro teams toured the US playing white or mixed-race teams of an amateur or semi-pro standing.  There was little to no collaboration between black teams, and few if any scheduled meetings.  Therefore, during this era, it was usually up to an individual team (or newspaper writer) to declare themselves the black champion and see if anyone challenged them.

Notes:
* — 1888 Four teams were selected by the Cuban Giants' owner to participate in a tournament to select a "Colored Champion"; the New York Gorhams finished third and the Norfolk Red Stockings finished fourth.

1892–1894: First crisis for organized black teams 

There were no championships claimed during this period.

Beginning around 1890, political and economic turmoil—eventually leading to the Panic of 1893—took a toll on the bottom line of each Negro team.  Every significant Negro team, except for two, ceased operations entirely.  Only one team, the Chicago Unions, managed to survive the crisis intact; while the Cuban Giants suspended play at the end of 1891 but reformed for the 1893 season.

1895–1919: Era of independent barnstorming teams 

Segregated baseball leagues, both black and white, started to appear around this time.  Starting in 1887, the International League began prohibiting the signing of black players.  By 1890, the last of the "white" leagues (the American Association and the National League) had unofficially banned blacks, and the color line was drawn.  Early on, due to social and lingering fiscal reasons, there was minimal interest and press coverage regarding black teams, so champions were not easily determined.  After the economic crisis had subsided around 1897, black teams began actively competing against other black teams for local or regional championships.

* — Disputed. Chicago won the "Chicago City League" tournament but the Kansas City Giants and St. Paul Gophers had both beaten Chicago and both claimed to be the "Champions of the West".

Notes:

Colored champions
The championships during this period were informal as the post-season challenges were issued by the individual teams.

Notes:
a,b — The X-Giants initially played the Unions for the championship; during the series, Columbia stepped up and issued challenges to the Unions for the Western championship and the X-Giants for the Colored championship.
* — 1915 Lincoln Stars were leading in the fourth inning of the ninth and deciding game when the game was called and never completed; the Stars then beat the second place Indianapolis ABCs 4 games to 2 and claimed the colored championship for 1915.

1920–1931: First endeavor of organized league play 

With the emergence of the hard-fisted leadership of former pitcher Rube Foster, playing a formal scheduled season between other black teams became reality.  Foster, known for his business acumen, recognized that attendance was just high enough so that a reasonable profit can be derived from gate receipts to sustain the travel and commitment required to maintain a league schedule.  This led to the formation of a handful of official Negro leagues, and later to a planned end-of-season World Series.

1921 — Southern Colored Champion: Nashville Elite Giants 4 games to 0 over Montgomery Grey Sox.

World champions

Beginning in 1924, the championships during this period were formal, pre-arranged post-season challenges agreed to by the respective leagues.  The 1922 championship was an informal post-season challenge issued by the individual teams.

Other post-season exhibitions:
 1920 Chicago American Giants (NNL1) (1–1) defeated Bacharach Giants (East) (0–1–1) who tied Hilldale Club (East) (1–0–1) who defeated Chicago American Giants.
 1921 Hilldale declared champs. Chicago American Giants (NNL1) 2–1–1 over Atlantic City Bacharach Giants; Hilldale 3–2–1 over Chicago American Giants.
 1929 no World Series but third place Chicago American Giants (NNL1) swept third place Homestead Grays (ANL) in a five-game series.
 1929 Kansas City Monarchs 4 games to 0 over Houston Black Buffaloes (TX-OK-LA League champ).
 1931 billed as a championship series, second place Homestead Grays (East) took six of nine from second place Kansas City Monarchs (NNL1).
 1931 Monroe Monarchs (TX-LA League) 4 games to 3 over Nashville Elite Giants (NSL).

Notes:
 1923 no World Series due to NNL feud with ECL over player raids.

1932–1935: Second crisis and rebuilding 

Crisis
Several factors led to the collapse of league play beginning with the 1928 break up of Eastern Colored League and then the 1929 folding of the American Negro League. These leagues were constantly warring with the Negro National League regarding player raiding and contract disputes; this led to an instability that was incompatible with the weakening economy.  That October saw the 1929 stock market crash, known as Black Tuesday, which was a sign of things to come.  In 1930, the NNL collapsed (largely due to the death of Rube Foster) but the individual teams continued to play.  The NNL regrouped for 1931, but again collapsed—this time for good and the teams were on their own.  By 1932, the Great Depression had taken a severe toll on the entire country.  Only a few organized Negro leagues survived and all of those were either a minor or semi-pro league.  The Negro Southern League was considered the highest quality surviving league and many players (and two teams) migrated to it; it therefore became the de facto major league for the 1932 season.

* — The East-West League was unable to survive the low attendance due to the Depression and folded mid-season; the Detroit Wolves had the best record at the time the league ceased operations, though no official champion was ever declared.  The Wolves later ended up going broke and also folding before the end of the season.

Rebuilding
After the worst of the depression had passed, teams were again able to profit from playing a league schedule.  At first, only a few team owners were able to put together enough investors to join a league; therefore, for the first time in black baseball, one league spanned both the eastern and western regions of the US.  A new Negro National League was formed with both east and west teams.

* — 1933 Pittsburgh Crawfords claimed first half title; the Chicago American Giants disputed that claim but the league dismissed it.  Pittsburgh and the Nashville Elite Giants tied for the second half title; Pittsburgh beat Nashville in a playoff 2 games to 1.  Pittsburgh was awarded the championship by the league's president (who was also the owner of the Crawfords).

1936–1948: Negro league glory years 

Negro league baseball hit its stride after the country had recovered from the devastation of the Great Depression.  The second incarnation of the Negro National League became the "eastern" league and a year later the new Negro American League assumed the role of the "western" league.  Both leagues generally respected the players' contracts and a relative peace existed between the leagues.  An agreed upon championship series was held at the end of the season between each league's pennant winner.  Only integration could challenge their success, and it came in 1946.  By 1949, the NNL broke up and the NAL was the only league in operation.

1937 – Chicago American Giants disputed first half title so a play-off occurred: Kansas City defeated Chicago 3 games to 1 with 1 tie.
1938 – declared "no contest"
1939 Grays owner offered a trophy to a 4-team tournament winner. First round:
Homestead Grays1&2 (1st place) 3–2 Philadelphia Stars (4th place)
Baltimore Elite Giants (3rd place) 3–1 Newark Eagles (2nd place)
1947 – Newark lost Larry Doby to the Cleveland Indians mid-season; at the end of the season Newark was so far inferior to New York that the league awarded the championship to New York

World champions

Post-1948: Integration and inevitable extinction 

By 1949, enough black talent had integrated into the white leagues (both major and minor) that the Negro leagues themselves had become a minor league circuit.  With the demise of the NNL, only the NAL remained as a top-tier league for black players.  If the purpose of the Negro leagues was to end segregation, then in 1947 (with Jackie Robinson's MLB debut) they became a success and their mission was complete.  With an infrastructure still in place and a viable audience for a short period of time, there was still money to be made for a few more years before total demise.  Therefore, the following teams are listed for posterity; the real black championship contest was now considered to be the annual East–West Game.

1949 Baltimore Elite Giants
1950 Indianapolis Clowns
1951 Indianapolis Clowns (East) declared champions over Kansas City Monarchs (West)
1952 Indianapolis Clowns1 named champions over Birmingham Black Barons2
1953 Kansas City Monarchs1&2
1954 Indianapolis Clowns1&2
1955 Kansas City Monarchs
1956 Detroit Stars
1957 Kansas City Monarchs

Regional and league championships by club 

Below are the regional and league championships by club. During the formative years until about 1891, it was usually up to an individual team (or newspaper writer) to declare themselves the black champion and see if anyone challenged them; these are listed in the chart as "Declared" champions. Later, up until the end of the Great Depression, there were periods when press coverage and fan interest waned to the point that some seasons a champion was not determined; in these years a champion was retroactively determined by historical research as to which team probably had the most successful season and these are listed in the chart as "Unofficial" champions. Where a champion was determined via a traditional play-off, it is listed in the chart as an "Earned" champion. Only the seasons prior to integration are considered for this table; teams who continued after 1948 are represented by a "+".

Teams with multiple championships (1867–1948)

* — The Chicago American Giants split from the Leland Giants who themselves were the result of a merge between the Chicago Unions and the Chicago Columbia Giants.  Excluding co-championships of the Columbia Giants and Unions in 1899 and 1900, this group of related teams can claim a total of 18 championships (7 earned, 8 declared, 3 unofficial).

Teams with a single championship (1867–1948)

Philadelphia Excelsiors (1867)
Philadelphia Pythians (1869)
Page Fence Giants (1896)
Algona Brownies (1903)
New York Lincoln Stars (1915, β-Declared)
Indianapolis ABCs (1916)
Detroit Stars (1919, β-Declared)
Brooklyn Royal Giants (1920)
Baltimore Black Sox (1929)
Detroit Wolves (1932, §-Unofficial)
Philadelphia Stars (1934)
Memphis Red Sox (1938)
Baltimore Elite Giants (1939)
Newark Eagles (1946)
New York Cubans (1947)

East–West All-Star game 

Major League Baseball began the tradition of an "All-Star" exhibition game between the stars of the American League and National League in 1933.  Encouraged by the success of the white game, Gus Greenlee organized a black All-Star game at the end of the 1933 season.  This game was to feature the top talent from the western region against the top eastern region talent, hence the name "East–West Game".  In the years a World Series was not held, the East–West Game was a surrogate championship game – replete with the media hype and sold-out attendance.

References

External links 

 Seamheads.com Negro Leagues Database
 Center for Negro League Baseball Research
 Negro Leagues @ Baseball-Reference.com
 Negro League Baseball Players Association
 Negro Leagues Baseball Museum web site

Negro league baseball
champions
Negro league